The Anti-Structures Munition is a developmental program for the British Army to provide a man-portable shoulder-launched weapon capable of destroying hardened structures such as buildings or bunkers. The system is planned to be in service by the end of 2009.

Program status
 May 2004 - Systems from Dynamit Nobel and Saab Bofors Dynamics selected for competition.
 February 2006 - Contract (£40m) awarded to Dynamit Nobel Defence for production of the Anti-Structures Munition (ASM) version of the MATADOR.
July 2019 - The UK is in the process of awarding a new contract of the Anti-Structures Munition.

Specifications
 Range: 500 m
 Warhead: "Enhanced blast warhead technology"

See also
 MATADOR (weapon)
 Panzerfaust 3

References

External links
 Dynamit Nobel Defence

Personal weapons
Rocket weapons
Surface-to-surface missiles
Anti-fortification weapons